Pallinup River is a river located in the Great Southern region of Western Australia. It was previously known as Salt River.

The Pallinup rises 10 km southeast of Broomehill, and flows in a southeasterly direction toward the coast passing through Kybelup Pool and discharging into the Southern Ocean via Beaufort Inlet.

The river is one of the longest rivers in the region and its tributaries flow through the towns of Borden and Gnowangerup.

The local Noongar people also know the river as the Mara River; it is regarded as a place of historical importance as the Noongar have camped, fished and traded along the banks of the river for generations.

The river is ephemeral and the estuary at Beaufort Inlet can be closed to the sea for long period of time by a sand bar in the channel.

The water in the river is considered to be saline with salinity levels varying from 3‰ when the river is flowing to over 50‰ in pools during summer.

Tributaries 

The Pallinup has many tributaries including Warperup Creek, Six Mile Creek, Pendenup Creek, Peendebup Creek, Monjebup Creek and Corackerup Creek. No potable surface water sources are present in the Pallinup. The water quality ranges from brackish to saline. The best quality water streams exist in the Stirling Range National Park area of the catchment, which is the occasional source of snow-melt water.

References

Rivers of the Great Southern region